The 1986–87 Pittsburgh Panthers men's basketball team represented the University of Pittsburgh in the 1986–87 NCAA Division I men's basketball season. Led by first year head coach Paul Evans, the Panthers finished with a record of 25–8. They received an at-large bid to the 1987 NCAA Division I men's basketball tournament where, as a #3 seed, they lost in the second round to Oklahoma.

Rankings

References

Pittsburgh Panthers men's basketball seasons
Pittsburgh
Pittsburgh
Pittsburgh Pan
Pittsburgh Pan